Hugh Edwin Beaumont Neilson (5 May 1884 – 16 October 1930) was a Scottish field hockey player who competed in the 1908 Summer Olympics. In 1908 he won the bronze medal as member of the Scotland team.

References

External links
 
profile

1884 births
1930 deaths
Olympic bronze medallists for Great Britain
Olympic field hockey players of Great Britain
British male field hockey players
Scottish male field hockey players
Hugh
Olympic medalists in field hockey
Scottish Olympic medallists
Medalists at the 1908 Summer Olympics
Field hockey players at the 1908 Summer Olympics